CCBA is an abbreviation that could refer to:
 Certification of Capability in Business Analysis, a business analysis professional certification awarded by the International Institute of Business Analysis
 Chinese Consolidated Benevolent Association, associations established in various parts of the United States with large populations of Chinese people.
 Climate, Community & Biodiversity Alliance, an initiative to promote the development of land management activities that simultaneously deliver significant benefits for climate, local communities, and biodiversity
 Coca-Cola Beverages Africa, beverage company in Southern and East Africa
 Cook County Bar Association, Illinois, United States